Bejcgyertyános is a village in Vas County, Hungary.

Populated places in Vas County

The population of Bejcgyertyános taken by 4 census. As of 1980(704), 1990(600), 2001(523), 2011(441), and 2019(433).